Utricularia forrestii is a small perennial carnivorous plant that belongs to the genus Utricularia. Its native distribution includes northern Burma and western China. It is represented in herberia by only four specimens. It was originally described by Peter Taylor in 1986 and named in honor of George Forrest.

See also 
 List of Utricularia species

References 

Carnivorous plants of Asia
Flora of Myanmar
Flora of China
Plants described in 1986
forrestii